The 2021 Northeast Conference baseball tournament began on May 27 and ends on May 30, 2021, at Senator Thomas J. Dodd Memorial Stadium in Norwich, Connecticut.  The league's top four finishers competed in the double elimination tournament. The tournament winner will earn the Northeast Conference's automatic bid to the 2021 NCAA Division I baseball tournament.

Seeding and format
The top four finishers were seeded one through four based on conference regular season winning percentage.  They then played a double-elimination tournament.

Bracket

References

Tournament
2021
2021 in sports in Connecticut
May 2021 sports events in the United States